Rendon is a census-designated place (CDP) in Tarrant County, Texas, United States. The population was 12,552 at the 2010 census.

Geography
Rendon is located at  (32.576641, -97.239680).

Demographics

2020 census

As of the 2020 United States census, there were 13,533 people, 4,525 households, and 3,739 families residing in the CDP.

2000 census
As of the census of 2000, there were 9,022 people, 3,221 households, and 2,576 families residing in the CDP. The population density was 364.4 people per square mile (140.7/km2). There were 3,404 housing units at an average density of 137.5/sq mi (53.1/km2). The racial makeup of the CDP was 90.07% White, 4.11% African American, 0.75% Native American, 0.34% Asian, 0.03% Pacific Islander, 3.56% from other races, and 1.13% from two or more races. Hispanic or Latino of any race were 7.83% of the population.

There were 3,221 households, out of which 34.4% had children under the age of 18 living with them, 67.6% were married couples living together, 8.5% had a female householder with no husband present, and 20.0% were non-families. 16.1% of all households were made up of individuals, and 5.9% had someone living alone who was 65 years of age or older. The average household size was 2.80 and the average family size was 3.12.

In the CDP, the population was spread out, with 26.4% under the age of 18, 6.8% from 18 to 24, 28.1% from 25 to 44, 27.8% from 45 to 64, and 10.8% who were 65 years of age or older. The median age was 39 years. For every 100 females, there were 100.5 males. For every 100 females age 18 and over, there were 99.0 males.

The median income for a household in the CDP was $51,065, and the median income for a family was $57,238. Males had a median income of $38,789 versus $25,771 for females. The per capita income for the CDP was $22,121. About 6.3% of families and 8.3% of the population were below the poverty line, including 12.3% of those under age 18 and 6.8% of those age 65 or over.

References

Dallas–Fort Worth metroplex
Census-designated places in Tarrant County, Texas
Census-designated places in Texas